The  is a professional wrestling championship in the Japanese promotion Gleat. The title is the first to be created by the promotion.

The inaugural champion is El Lindaman, who was crowned at G Prowrestling Ver. 18, on February 22, 2022, after winning a 12-man tournament. The current champion is Kaito Ishida, who won the title at Gleat Ver. 5 on January 8, 2023.

History

Gleat was founded in 2020, after Lidet Entertainment sold all its shares of Pro Wrestling Noah to CyberAgent. Lidet's President Hiroyuki Suzuki, wanting to continue his involvement with professional wrestling, announced the formation of Gleat in August 2020, alongside Kiyoshi Tamura, Kaz Hayashi and Nosawa Rongai. The promotion features two brands: G Prowrestling, a traditional puroresu brand, and Lidet UWF, a shoot style brand inspired by UWF International.

In December 2021, Gleat announced the creation of the G-Rex Championship for its G Prowrestling brand. A 12-man tournament was held from January 26, 2022, to February 22 to crown the inaugural champion.

Inaugural tournament

Reigns

See also
Professional wrestling in Japan

References

Professional wrestling championships
Professional wrestling in Japan
Openweight wrestling championships